Rosa rugosa (rugosa rose, beach rose, Japanese rose, Ramanas rose, or letchberry) is a species of rose native to eastern Asia, in northeastern China, Japan, Korea and southeastern Siberia, where it grows on beach coasts, often on sand dunes. It should not be confused with Rosa multiflora, which is also known as "Japanese rose". The Latin word "rugosa" means  "wrinkled", referring to the wrinkled leaves.

Description
Rosa rugosa is a suckering shrub which develops new plants from the roots and forms dense thickets 1–1.50 m tall with stems densely covered in numerous short, straight prickles 3–10 mm long. The leaves are 8–15 cm long, pinnate with 5–9 leaflets, most often 7, each leaflet 3–4 cm long, with a distinctly corrugated (rugose, hence the species' name) surface. The leaf is elliptical in shape with a rounded base or broadly cuneate with a leather feel, dark green top. The back of the leaf is composed of a green-grey colour with hair along the veins. The leaf margin is composed of teeth along the edges and is crenate-serrate. The flower has five petals that are usually 6–9 cm in width. The flower is composed of 200–250 stamens per flow and vary in style.  The flowers are pleasantly scented, dark pink to white (on R. rugosa f. alba (Ware) Rehder), 6–9 cm across, with somewhat wrinkled petals; flowering occurs in spring.

The edible hips, which resemble cherry tomatoes, are large, 2–3 cm diameter, and often shorter than their diameter, not elongated; in late summer and early autumn the plants often bear fruit and flowers at the same time. The leaves typically turn bright yellow before falling in autumn.

History
This rose species was introduced to America from Japan in the mid-19th century; it was valued because it can tolerate salt water spray.

Cultivation and uses
Rosa rugosa is widely used as an ornamental plant. It has been introduced to numerous areas of Europe and North America. It has many common names, several of which refer to the fruit's resemblance to a tomato, including beach tomato or sea tomato; others include saltspray rose, beach rose, potato rose and Turkestan rose. In parts of the US the fruits are also occasionally called beach plums, causing confusion with the plant properly bearing that name, Prunus maritima.

The sweetly scented flowers are traditionally used to make flower jam and dessert in China. They are also used to make pot-pourri in Japan and China. It is used in traditional Chinese medicine to treat irregular menstruation and gastritis. Beach rose hips, like those of other rose species, are edible and can be used to make jams, syrups, tea, or eaten raw. 

This species hybridises readily with many other roses, and is valued by rose breeders for its considerable resistance to the diseases rose rust and rose black spot. It is also extremely tolerant of seaside salt spray and storms, commonly being the first shrub in from the coast. It is widely used in landscaping, being relatively tough and trouble-free. Needing little maintenance due to its being very disease resistant, it is suitable for planting in large numbers; its salt-tolerance makes it useful for planting beside roads which need deicing with salt regularly.

Numerous cultivars have been selected for garden use, with flower colour varying from white to dark red-purple, and with semi-double to double flowers where some or all of the stamens are replaced by extra petals. Popular examples include 'Rubra Plena' (semi-double variant, with strong clove scented dark pink petals and dark green wrinkled leaves and large round orange-red hips), 'Hansa' (very fragrant, red-purple double), 'Fru Dagmar Hastrup' (pink, single), 'Pink Grootendorst' (pink, semi-double), 'Blanc Double de Coubert' (white, double) and the more common 'Roseraie de L'Haÿ' (pink, double), which is often used for its very successful rootstock and its ornamental rose hips.

Economic effects 
Varieties of this species are sold in nurseries. In cultivation, it has been cross-bred with other roses. It is valued for its attractive flowers, and it is often used to create hedges and windbreakers. It can control erosion and is planted along highways in Germany and Denmark.

Invasive species
Rosa rugosa is naturalized in many parts of Europe, and it is considered an invasive species in some habitats, particularly in seashores of Northern Europe. It was first introduced into England from Japan in 1796, and then in Germany in 1845. This was the first presence of the flower within the European continent. In 1875, Rosa rugosa was found in Denmark and then in Sweden in 1918. By 2001, the flower species had become well established within 61 European countries. Although it is native within China, it has been labeled as an endangered species due to a noticeable high decline in population rates of the flower. The species was able to spread due to birds and animals that eat the berries from the bush and people buying the rose and taking it with them overseas. It can outcompete native flora, thereby threatening biological diversity. On Sylt, an island in the north of Germany, it is sufficiently abundant to have become known as the "Sylt rose". 

It is considered noxious in some states of the US. R. rugosa was first introduced into North America in 1845. The first report of it being naturalized far from the location in which it was planted occurred on Nantucket in 1899 and was spreading rapidly by 1911. By 1920, the rose had been well established in Nantucket and in Connecticut. Ten years later it was said to be "straying rapidly" and today it is naturalized on the entire coast of New England and in scattered locations around the Northeast and Pacific Northwest.

Potential allergen 
Pollen or fragrance of rose may cause an allergic reaction.

Vernacular names
In Japanese, it is called  "beach aubergine",  "beach pear", or simply  "rose". In  Mandarin Chinese, it is called méiguì huā "rose" or cì méiguì "thorned rose". In Korean, the species is called haedanghwa, literally "flowers near the seashore".

References

External links
 hort.net profile Rosa rugosa

 
 

rugosa
Flora of China
Flora of Japan
Flora of Korea
Flora of Russia
Flora of Asia
Garden plants
Taxa named by Carl Peter Thunberg